28S ribosomal protein S5, mitochondrial, otherwise called uS5m, is a protein that in humans is encoded by the MRPS5 gene.

Function 

Mammalian mitochondrial ribosomal proteins are encoded by nuclear genes and help in protein synthesis within the mitochondrion. Mitochondrial ribosomes (mitoribosomes) consist of a small 28S subunit and a large 39S subunit. They have an estimated 75% protein to rRNA composition compared to prokaryotic ribosomes, where this ratio is reversed. Another difference between mammalian mitoribosomes and prokaryotic ribosomes is that the latter contain a 5S rRNA. Among different species, the proteins comprising the mitoribosome differ greatly in sequence, and sometimes in biochemical properties, which prevents easy recognition by sequence homology. This gene encodes a 28S subunit protein that belongs to the ribosomal protein S5P family. Pseudogenes corresponding to this gene are found on chromosomes 4q, 5q, and 18q.

Model organisms 

Model organisms have been used in the study of MRPS5 function. A conditional knockout mouse line called Mrps5tm1b(EUCOMM)Wtsi was generated at the Wellcome Trust Sanger Institute. Male and female animals underwent a standardized phenotypic screen to determine the effects of deletion. Additional screens performed:  - In-depth immunological phenotyping

References

Further reading

External links 
 

Ribosomal proteins